Events in the year 1839 in Mexico.

Incumbents 

 President – Anastasio Bustamante until March 20, Antonio López de Santa Anna until July 10, Nicolás Bravo until July 19, Anastasio Bustamante

Governors
 Aguascalientes:
 Chiapas: Salvador Ayanegui
 Chihuahua: 
 Coahuila: Francisco García Conde/Isidro Reyes
 Durango:  
 Guanajuato: 
 Guerrero: 
 Jalisco: Antonio Escobedo
 State of Mexico:  
 Michoacán: 
 Nuevo León: Joaquín García/Manuel María de Llano
 Oaxaca: 
 Puebla: 
 Querétaro: Ramón Covarrubias 
 San Luis Potosí: 
 Sinaloa: 
 Sonora: 
 Tabasco: 
 Tamaulipas: José Antonio Fernández Izaguirre/Jose Antonio Quintero
 Veracruz: 
 Yucatán: 
 Zacatecas:

Events

 November 27, 1838 – March 9, 1839 – Pastry War
 May 2, 1839 – Santiago Imán heads a peasant revolt in the Yucatán.

Notable births
 * May 25 Manuel Sánchez Mármol – writer, lawyer, politician, and a member of the Mexican Academy of Language was born in Cunduacán, Tabasco

Notable deaths
 May 3 José Antonio Mexía – politician executed in Acajete, Veracruz (born 1800)

Dates unknown
 José María Lanz – engineer and author, died in Paris (born 1764)
 Francisco María Ruiz – soldier and settler of San Diego, Alta California (born 1754)

Notes

 
Mexico
Independent Mexico
Years of the 19th century in Mexico